Several notable persons of the ancient world were named Antipater, Antipatros (from , literally meaning "like the father"):

Hellenistic leaders
 Antipater (c. 397–319 BC), Macedonian general
 Antipater II of Macedon, king of Macedon from 297 to 294 BC
 Antipater Etesias (died 279 BC), king of Macedon
 Antipater of Derbe

Herodians
 Antipater the Idumaean (died 43 BC), father of Herod the Great
 Antipater (son of Herod I) (46–4 BC), son of Herod the Great
 Antipater, son of Salome, Herod the Great's sister
 Antipater, son of Salampsio, Herod the Great's daughter, and Phasael ben Phasael

Philosophers
 Antipater of Cyrene (c. 4th century BC), philosopher of the Cyrenaic school
 Antipater of Tarsus (died 130 BC), Stoic philosopher
 Antipater of Tyre (died 45 BC), Stoic philosopher

Writers
 Antipater (writer), wrote on the subject of dreams
 Antipater of Acanthus, Greek grammarian of uncertain date
 Antipater of Bostra, bishop of Bostra in Arabia, fl. 460. His chief work was Antirrhesis, a reply to Pamphilus's Apology for Origen
 Antipater of Sidon (2nd century BC), best known for his list of the Seven Wonders of the World
 Antipater of Thessalonica (1st century BC), poet
 Antipater (1st century BC physician)
 Antipater (2nd century physician)
 Antipater (astrologer), who wrote a work upon genethialogia
 Aelius Antipater, writer and governor (Severan era)
 Lucius Coelius Antipater, annalist, 2nd century BC

Others
 Antipater of Phlya, leading Athenian statesman under Augustus
Antipater son of Epigonus, Greek Prince from Asia Minor who was the son of Epigonos of Telmessos
 Antipater, celebrated silver-chaser (Naturalis Historia, xxxiii. 55)

See also
The modern surname Antipa(s) comes from Antipater. See:
Antipas (disambiguation)
Stella Antipa, Greek actress